Visa requirements for Omani citizens are administrative entry restrictions by the authorities of other states placed on citizens of the Oman. As of 13 April 2021, Omani citizens had visa-free or visa on arrival access to 80 countries and territories, ranking the Omani passport 65th in terms of travel freedom according to the Henley Passport Index.

Omani citizens do not need a visa to enter other member states of the GCC.

Visa requirements map

Visa requirements

See also

Visa policy of Oman
 Omani passport

References and Notes
References

Notes

Oman
Government of Oman